Atrioventricular (having to do with an atrium and ventricle) can refer to:
Left atrioventricular opening
Atrioventricular fistula
Atrioventricular node
Atrioventricular valves, the mitral valve and tricuspid valve